Lieutenant General Sir William George Shedden Dobbie,  (12 July 1879 – 3 October 1964) was a British Army officer who served in the Second Boer War and the First and Second World Wars.

Early life
William was born in Madras to a civil servant father, W. H. Dobbie of the Indian Civil Service – and to a family with a long military lineage. When he was only nine months old, his parents left him in the care of relatives in England, so that he might receive an education in keeping with his family's station.
At thirteen, young William won a scholarship to Charterhouse School and became a top-ranking classical scholar and a keen student of ancient military campaigns. Upon graduation, he proved to be qualified for a military career at the Royal Military Academy, Woolwich, from which, in due course, he went to the Royal School of Military Engineering at Chatham. He was commissioned a second lieutenant in the Royal Engineers on 6 August 1899.

Second Boer War to First World War
Dobbie joined the Second Boer War shortly after the funeral of Queen Victoria in February 1901, and was promoted to lieutenant while in South Africa, on 1 April 1902. He was wounded, and returned to the United Kingdom shortly after the end of hostilities, arriving in Southampton in July 1902. He later opined that the Second Boer War was a rather unjust war. Following his return he was stationed at Chatham in late 1902, and was promoted to captain on 6 August 1908. He attended the Staff College, Camberley, from 1911 to 1912.

First World War
Dobbie was appointed a Knight of the Legion of Honour in November 1914 and appointed a GSO 3rd Grade on 1 April 1915. He was awarded the Distinguished Service Order on 14 January 1916, promoted to major on 1 April 1916, promoted to temporary lieutenant colonel on 19 August 1916 (retroactive from 6 July 1915 on 1 January 1920) and brevetted to lieutenant colonel on 1 January 1917. During the First World War, Dobbie happened to have been the staff officer on duty in November 1918 and his is the only signature on the cease-fire telegram that was sent to all troops. In later years, when asked what he did during the war, Dobbie would reply "I stopped the bloody thing!". After the war Dobbie was appointed an Officer of the Order of Leopold on 21 August 1919.

Interwar years
Dobbie was graded a temporary lieutenant colonel on 18 April 1920 and brevetted to colonel on 1 July 1922. He was promoted to lieutenant colonel on 1 January 1925 and to colonel on 18 January 1926. On 29 June 1928, he was appointed commander of the Cairo Brigade with the rank of brigadier, then considered a temporary rank. He was appointed a Companion of the Order of the Bath in the 1930 New Year Honours List. He reverted to his permanent rank of colonel and ceased to be employed from 15 July 1932, being placed on half-pay. On 18 February 1933, he was promoted to major general and appointed Commandant of the School of Military Engineers. He was appointed General Officer Commanding Malaya Command on 8 November 1935, holding the post to 1939.

Second World War
Dobbie, then holding the rank of major general, was informed that after Malaya he would be retired, because new War Office regulations deemed him too old for a further position. After war was declared in September, he was frustrated in his attempts to return to active service, until in April 1940 he encountered the Chief of the Imperial General Staff, Edmund Ironside, who offered him the position of Governor of Malta and Commander-in-chief of Malta. As acting Governor, he was granted the acting rank of lieutenant-general on 27 April 1940, and was knighted as a Knight Commander of the Order of the Bath on 14 March 1941. Promoted to temporary lieutenant general on 27 April, he was confirmed as Governor of Malta on 19 May. He remained Governor of Malta until May 1942, and retired with the honorary rank of lieutenant-general on 10 November 1942.

When he arrived on Malta, its defensibility was in question because of the presumed ease with which Italy could overrun it. There were only 4 planes on the island and these had probably been overlooked. Few other than Churchill saw any strategic value in maintaining it and the commitment of the Maltese to the British cause was also questioned.

On the day Italy declared war Dobbie issued a statement to the garrison:
The decision of His Majesty's government to fight until our enemies are defeated will be heard with the greatest satisfaction by all ranks of the Garrison of Malta.
It may be that hard times lie ahead of us, but I know that however hard they may be, the courage and determination of all ranks will not falter, and that with God's help we will maintain the security of this fortress.
I call on all officers and other ranks humbly to seek God's help, and then in reliance on Him to do their duty unflinchingly.

Despite being a Protestant on a Catholic island, his faith became an asset. Admiral Cunningham, commander-in-chief of the Mediterranean Fleet, described him as "an Ironside of a man. His profound faith in the justice of our cause made a great impression on the religious Maltese. The complete and calm faith shown in the broadcasts he made nearly every evening contributed immensely towards keeping up the morale of the people".

Over the next two years, Malta was a crucial element of war in the Mediterranean. Churchill responded to Dobbie's requests for planes and reinforcements and the Malta Fortress played a key part in reducing the German supply lines in North Africa, until the Luftwaffe joined in the most intense bombardment of the war in early 1942. In two months there were 500 air raids during which 27 times the tonnage of bombs were dropped as in the Coventry Blitz.

Two attempts to relieve the island failed when supply ships were bombed in the harbour and a succession of Spitfires were picked off on the ground shortly after delivery. There also were problems in the Administrative Council in which a blame culture had emerged. Despite a visit from Dobbie's friend Lord Cranbourne, in May 1942 Churchill replaced Dobbie, who was exhausted and unwell, with Viscount Gort. Gort brought with him the George Cross that had been awarded to the island by King George VI. Dobbie himself received the Knight Grand Cross of the Order of St Michael and St George.

Personal life and later years
He and his wife Sybil (nee Orde-Browne) had one daughter, also called Sybil, who was married to Percival Johnston. They also had two sons, Arthur William Granville Dobbie who died on the 19th of June 1944 aged 38 and was a member of the Royal Engineers 237th Field Company. Orde Charles Staple Dobbie was their other son.

Dobbie was a member of the Protestant Plymouth Brethren, and when living in The Paragon, Blackheath, attended the large Brethren assembly in Nightingale Vale, Woolwich Common, London SE18.  He was a member of the Board of Governors of Monkton Combe School in Somerset from 1942 to 1964.

Dobbie died on 3 October 1964 in Kensington, London, England, at the age of 85 years. He was buried in Charlton Cemetery, near the Chindit memorial of his nephew Major General Orde Wingate (1903–1944). His wife Sybil and other members of his family are also buried there.

Dobbie's hypothesis regarding the capture of Singapore
In 1936, Dobbie, then General Officer Commanding (Malaya) stationed in Singapore, made an inquiry to find out if more forces were required on mainland Malaya to prevent the Japanese landing and capturing forward bases to attack Singapore. Percival, then his Chief Staff Officer, was assigned the task of drawing up a tactical appreciation on how the Japanese were most likely to attack. Percival's report in late 1937 did confirm that north Malaya could serve as a base for the conquest of Singapore and Borneo.
Both Dobbie and Percival made it clear that Singapore could no longer be seen as a self-contained naval base, and that its survival rested on the defence of mainland Malaya. So in May 1938, Dobbie wrote to the Chief of Staff:

Dobbie added that an attack might be possible between the months of November and March, despite high winds and waves produced by the northeast monsoon. The recent landing of "5000 smuggled coolies" at this time dissolved any preconceptions that the monsoon offered protection. On the contrary, this monsoon would provide good cloud cover for the invaders.

Quotes

 Reverend Daniel A. Poling, 1943
 Never before in any comparable area, have I found so many ranking executives giving so much attention to religion.
 Prime Minister Churchill
 [Dobbie is] a Governor of outstanding character who inspired all ranks and classes, military and civil, with his … determination … a soldier who … in … leadership and religious zeal … recalled memories of General Gordon and … the Ironsides and Covenanters.
 Lord Louis Mountbatten
 [Dobbie] prays aloud after dinner, invoking the aid of God in destroying our enemies. This is highly approved of by the Maltese, who have the same idea about God, but I would prefer an efficient Air force here.
 Mabel Strickland
 At San Anton, every night about seven, everyone would be summoned for prayer … Dobbie would stand … and … pray … and … ask the Almighty to bless the convoy … but he never prayed to stop the bombing … that was God's will … God helps those that help themselves …
 William Dobbie, on British intervention to restore order in the Arab-Jewish riots of 1928
 This will be the easiest war … We will have to fight only four days a week. The Arabs won't fight on Friday, the Jews on Saturday and Dobbie certainly won't on Sunday.
 Dobbie was stationed in Palestine and had an office overlooking (Gordon's) Golgotha. In 1929 the Bible Society distributed New Testaments to the British soldiers serving there. Dobbie wrote the following note which was inserted into each copy for his troops:
{{blockquote|You are stationed at the place where the central event in human history occurred – namely the crucifixion of the Son of God. You may see the place where this happened and you may read the details in this book. As you do this, you cannot help being interested, but your interest will change into something far deeper when you realise the events concern you personally. It was for your sake the Son of God died on the cross here. The realisation of this fact cannot but produce a radical change in one's life – and the study of this book will, under God's guidance, help you to such a realisation. W.G.S. Dobbie (Brigadier) 10 October 1929.}}
 I can't help feeling that the security of the Fortress might be better served by having a stronger force in being outside it … I consequently feel that the answers to the possible threat (of Japanese landing and establishing an advanced base on the mainland) is primarily to be found in suitable mobile forces in being in the Malay Peninsula … – Dobbie's letter as GOC (Malaya), to the War Office on 17 March 1936.

References

Sources

Further reading
 Dobbie, Lt-Gen Sir William (1944) A Very Present Help. Zondervan, Grand Rapids, Michigan.
 Dobbie, Sybil (1944) Grace Under Malta. London : Lindsay Drummond.
 Dobbie, Sybil (1979) Faith & Fortitude. The Life & Works of General Sir William Dobbie : 
 Dobbie's report on the military weakness of Singapore, and on the probable plan of Japanese attack, is discussed at some length in War and Remembrance'' (1978) by Herman Wouk.

External links
 Royal Engineers Museum Detailed biography
 Royal Engineers Museum Dobbie in Malta (Second World War)
 The Defence Of Malta: an address by Lt. General Sir William G. S. Dobbie, G.C.M.G., K.C.B., D.S.O., LL.D, at The Empire Club of Canada, Toronto, Canada on Thursday, 22 February 1945. Presented by Club Chairman Mr. C. R. Conquergood.
 Cricinfo – Officials and Players: William Dobbie Contains brief profile of Sir William Dobbie and his cricket scores profile.
British Army Officers 1939–1945
Generals of World War II

|-

|-

1879 births
1964 deaths
People educated at Charterhouse School
Royal Engineers officers
British Army personnel of the Second Boer War
British Army personnel of World War I
British Army generals of World War II
Knights Grand Cross of the Order of St Michael and St George
Knights Commander of the Order of the Bath
Companions of the Distinguished Service Order
Bailiffs Grand Cross of the Order of St John
Military of Singapore under British rule
British Plymouth Brethren
Governors and Governors-General of Malta
Graduates of the Royal Military Academy, Woolwich
Graduates of the Staff College, Camberley
English cricketers
Europeans cricketers
Governors of Monkton Combe School
British Army lieutenant generals
Military personnel of British India